The Studio Girl is a 1918 American silent comedy film directed by Charles Giblyn and starring Constance Talmadge, Earle Foxe, and Edna Earle.

Cast
 Constance Talmadge as Celia Laird 
 Earle Foxe as Frazer Ordway 
 Edna Earle as Adriana Peroni 
 Johnny Hines as Obediah Daw 
 Gertrude Norman as Mrs. Daw 
 Isabel O'Madigan as Harriet Farnum 
 Grace Barton as Rachel Farnum 
 Ferdinand Tidmarsh as Dr. Walter Grierson

References

Bibliography
 Donald W. McCaffrey & Christopher P. Jacobs. Guide to the Silent Years of American Cinema. Greenwood Publishing, 1999.

External links

1918 films
1918 comedy films
Silent American comedy films
Films directed by Charles Giblyn
American silent feature films
1910s English-language films
American black-and-white films
American films based on plays
Selznick Pictures films
1910s American films